The 2021–22 season is PAS Giannina F.C.'s 26th competitive season in the top flight of Greek football, 11th season in the Super League Greece, and 56th year in existence as a football club. They also compete in the Greek Cup.

Players 
updated 21 January 2022

International players

Foreign players

Personnel

Management

Coaching staff

Medical staff

Academy

Transfers

Summer

In

Out

Winter

In

Out

Pre-season and friendlies

Competitions

Super League 1

League table

Results summary

Fixtures

Play-off round 
The top six teams from Regular season will meet twice (10 matches per team) for places in 2022–23 UEFA Champions League and 2022–23 UEFA Europa Conference League as well as deciding the league champion.

Results summary

Fixtures

Greek Cup

Fifth round

Statistics

Appearances 

Super League Greece

Goalscorers 

Super League Greece

Clean sheets

Disciplinary record

Best goal award

Other awards 

 Super League Fantasy League Player of the Season
 Yuri Lodygin: 2021–22
 Super League Fantasy League Goalkeeper of the Season
 Yuri Lodygin: 2021–22
 Super League Fantasy League Defender of the Season
 Rodrigo Erramuspe: 2021–22
 Super League most ball steals
 Zisis Karachalios: 2021–22
 Manolis Saliakas ranked 5th 
 Super League most successful crosses
 Manolis Saliakas: 2021–22
 Super League most clean sheets
 Yuri Lodygin: 2021–22
Super League Team of the Year
Yuri Lodygin
Giannis Kargas
Manolis Saliakas
Super League Manager of the Year
Iraklis Metaxas (3rd)

References

External links 

 official website

PAS Giannina F.C. seasons
Greek football clubs 2021–22 season